Rava is an Italian-origin surname. People with the surname include:

 Enrico Rava (born 1939), Italian musician
 Giovanni Rava (1874–1944), Italian painter
 Luigi Rava (1860–1938), Italian politician 
 Malati Rava Roy, Indian politician
 Pietro Rava (1916–2006), Italian football player
 Prithiraj Rava (born 1957), Indian politician and actor

See also
 Rava (disambiguation)

Italian-language surnames